Cadmium lactate is an organic chemical compound, a salt of cadmium and lactic acid with the formula Cd(C3H5O3)2.

Synthesis
1. Dissolving of cadmium carbonate in lactic acid.

2. Also by mixing boiling solutions of lactate of lime and cadmium sulphate.

Physical properties
Cadmium lactate forms colorless (white) crystals.

Soluble in water, insoluble in ethanol.

A carcinogen and poison.

References

External links
Cadmium lactate

Lactates
Cadmium compounds